Cleptometopus fisheri is a species of beetle in the family Cerambycidae. It was described by Gardner in 1941.

References

fisheri
Beetles described in 1941